Hillel "Helly" Nahmad (born 23 November 1976) is an independent British art dealer of Syrian and Lebanese descent.

Early life
Hillel "Helly" Nahmad was born in November 1976, the son of the art dealer Ezra Nahmad. He attended St Paul's School, before reading History of Art at the Courtauld Institute of Art. In 1997, he had Italian nationality.

Career
In 1998 Nahmad founded an eponymous modern art gallery in Cork Street, Mayfair, specialising in works by Pablo Picasso, Wassily Kandinsky, Henri Matisse, Claude Monet, René Magritte, Kasimir Malevich and Joan Miró among others. This gallery is not to be confused with a different gallery of the same name based in New York, opened by another Nelly Nahmad, his cousin and the son of his uncle David, and which operates as a completely separate entity. Nahmad is a frequent commentator on the art market.

In 2011 Nahmad organised and curated the first ever exhibition of highlights from the Nahmad Collection at Kunsthaus Zurich. The exhibition comprised over 100 masterpieces by artists from the Impressionist, Surrealist and Cubist movements, including Claude Monet, Edgar Degas, Pierre-Auguste Renoir, Henri de Toulouse-Lautrec, Pablo Picasso, Juan Gris, René Magritte, Max Ernst, Joan Miró, and Georges Braque. Works displayed included those which have been in his family collection for decades, and which have rarely been exhibited in public before. Nahmad spoke about the exhibition to Jackie Wullschlager for Lunch with the FT.

This exhibition was followed in 2013 by 'Picasso in the Nahmad Collection', at the Grimaldi Forum in Monaco, an exhibition of over 120 works from the collection brought together to celebrate the worldwide 40th anniversary of the artist. The exhibition was curated by the Director of the Musée Picasso in Antibes, Jean-Louis Andral, and Marilyn McCully, an expert on the artist.

Recent exhibitions at the Helly Nahmad Gallery in London have included a retrospective of Monet, which featured seventeen paintings by the Impressionist, including two views of London kindly loaned by the Kunsthaus in Zurich. The Financial Times called the exhibition "the best show in London this winter". This was followed by an ambitious exhibition of Matisse's female portraits and included a generous loan from Tate Modern of one painting, 'La Liseuse distraite' (1919), along with the artist's series of four monumental bronze female backs, entitled 'Nu de dos I-IV' which were conceived circa 1909–30.

In 2014, Helly Nahmad London presented 'The Collector' at Frieze Masters 2014, a full scale imaginary collector's apartment set in Paris in 1968, curated by Helly Nahmad and designed in collaboration with leading British production designer, Robin Brown and creative producer Anna Pank. Scott Reyburn of The International New York Times stated that "London dealer Helly Nahmad evoked that "true" collecting spirit." Further comments and reviews of 'The Collector' at Frieze Masters 2014 can be found at Vogue Italia and The Guardian. After the exhibition, Helly Nahmad London commissioned a short film of 'The Collector', inspired by their Frieze stand; the full version is available online.

Since then Nahmad has aimed to lend art works as widely as possible so that the collection can be accessed by the public.

References

External links

Nahmad Foundation exhibition at Kunsthaus, Zurich

1976 births
Living people
People educated at St Paul's School, London
Alumni of the Courtauld Institute of Art
English art collectors
Jewish art collectors
Art dealers from London
21st-century British businesspeople
British people of Syrian-Jewish descent
English people of Lebanese-Jewish descent
English Sephardi Jews
Helly